Roman Gottfried Haavamägi (until 1937 Espenberg; 15 February 1891 Tallinn – 3 January 1964 Haapsalu) was an Estonian sculptor, painter and graphic artist.

1914-1917 he studied at Tallinn Art Industrial School (now, the Estonian Academy of Arts), and at Nikolai Triik's studio. Since 1922 he was a freelance artist.

Gallery

References

1891 births
1964 deaths
20th-century Estonian sculptors
20th-century Estonian male artists
20th-century Estonian painters
Estonian printmakers
Estonian Academy of Arts alumni
Artists from Tallinn